Samuel Reay (17 March 1828 – 21 July 1905) was an organist and composer based in England.

Life

He was born on 17 March 1828, the son of George Agnew Reay, organist of Hexham Abbey, and Eleanor Spraggon.

His father moved to Ryton on Tyne and Samuel became a chorister in the choir at Durham Cathedral.

He is noted for having performed the first organ arrangement of Mendelssohn's "Wedding March" which he arranged whilst in Tiverton.

Whilst in Newark he was conductor of the Newark Philharmonic Society.

Appointments

Assistant Organist of St Hilda's Church, South Shields 1839 - ????
Organist of Houghton-le-Spring
Organist of St Andrew's Church, Newcastle upon Tyne 1841 - 1845
Organist of St. Thomas the Martyr, Barras Bridge 1845 - 1847
Organist of St Peter's Church, Tiverton 1847 - 1854
Organist of St. John's Church, Hampstead 1854 - 1856
Organist of St. Saviour's Church, Warwick Road 1856- ????
Organist of St Stephen's Church, Westbourne Park, Paddington ???? - 1859
Organist of St. Peter's College, Radley 1859 - 1861
Organist of the Church of St Mary the Virgin, Bury 1861 - 1864
Organist of the Church of St. Mary Magdalene, Newark-on-Trent 1864 - 1901 and Master of the Song School 1864 - 1905

Compositions

His compositions include: 
Morning and Evening Services in F, G, D, B flat and A
Anthems and Part Songs.

References

1828 births
1905 deaths
English organists
British male organists
English composers
19th-century English musicians
19th-century British male musicians
19th-century organists